Manfred Baumann (born 1968) is an Austrian photographer. Manfred is best known for his portraits of celebrities, Landscape, wildlife and Street Photography.

Life and work 

Born in 1968 in Vienna, Baumann grew up in Vienna's 13th district of Hietzing, where he also attended school. At 16, after graduating from general secondary school, he started an apprenticeship at Julius Meinl, a manufacturer and retailer of coffee, gourmet foods and other grocery products, where he also worked as manager for a year.

In 1995, he moved to Canada to work as a photographer. After two years he returned to Vienna where he continued to work as a freelance photographer. Baumann cites his grandfather, who was also a photographer, as one of his greatest sources of inspiration. His grandfather also encouraged his talents as a photographer by giving him his first camera, a Praktica.

From 2002, Baumann has photographed celebrities. Since 2012 he has also been an official photographer for PETA, for which he has photographed more celebrities.

In 2013 he began a partnership with the National Geographic Society, and in 2016 with Leica Camera.

In autumn 2017, his series Mustangs was exhibited in the Natural History Museum Vienna. In 2018/2019 the Grand Hotel Wien exhibited his series Vienna - Grand Hotel Vienna. In May 2019, Baumann exhibits Hoch leben die Wälder in the Black Forest, where he photographed 15 Black Forest originals. Since 2020 he has a permanent exhibition Lipizzaner in the Spanish Riding School in Vienna.

Baumann's work has been published in different photo specialist magazines like People Magazine Chicago Tribune and Daily Californian. His photographs can also be seen in glossy magazines like Playboy, GQ FHM, and SternPersonal life
Baumann is married and he has a son. He lives in Austria. He is a vegetarian and supports different animal welfare organizations. He is Honorary Ambassador of Jane Goodall with his wife Nelly Baumann.

 Publications 
 Live. Bucher. .
 Manfred Baumann Calendar 2013. .
 Sexy Camera Work. Skylight. .
 Manfred Baumann Calendar 2012. .
 Manfred Baumann Calendar 2011. .
 Manfred Baumann - Photographie. .
 Erotic Vision. Skylight. .
 Celebrities. Novum. .
 Fine nude art. Media Service Stuttgart. .
 Just Naked!. Heel. .
 Top 20 Girls 2008. Mohn Kalender. .
 L.A.Stories. echomedia. .
 Alte Welt, neue Welt. National Geographic. .
 my world of photography 1991-2016. Novum. .
 Mustangs - .
 Vienna Edition Roesner, Krems an der Donau 2018. .
 Face to Face. Hatje Cantz. .

 Exhibitions 

 2012: Exhibition and star guest of Photokina, Cologne
 2013: Alive, Vienna
 2015: L.A.Stories, Schladming
 2017 Mustangs, Natural History Museum Vienna
 2019: Hoch leben die Wälder, Black Forest
 2019: Live up the woods, Hinterzarten
 2020: Lipizzaner, the Spanish Riding School
 2021: Face to Face'', ViENNABallhaus

References

External links 
 
 Lomography Interview
 Ephotozine Interview
 Stern Interview
 Sir Roger was impressed by Baumann
 Interview with Baumann (Video)
 

1968 births
Austrian photographers
Fashion photographers
Living people